Myoglobinuria is the presence of myoglobin in the urine, which usually results from rhabdomyolysis or muscle injury. Myoglobin is present in muscle cells as a reserve of oxygen.

Signs and symptoms

Signs and symptoms of myoglobinuria are usually nonspecific and needs some clinical prudence. Therefore, among the possible signs and symptoms to look for would be:

Swollen and painful muscles
Fever, nausea 
Delirium (elderly individuals)
Myalgia 
Dark urine
Calcium ion loss

Causes

Trauma, vascular problems, malignant hyperthermia, certain drugs and other situations can destroy or damage the muscle, releasing myoglobin to the circulation and thus to the kidneys. Under ideal situations myoglobin will be filtered and excreted with the urine, but if too much myoglobin is released into the circulation or in case of kidney problems, it can occlude the kidneys' filtration system leading to acute tubular necrosis and acute kidney injury.

Other causes of myoglobinuria include:
McArdle's disease  
Phosphofructokinase deficiency
Carnitine palmitoyltransferase II deficiency  
Malignant hyperthermia  
Polymyositis  
Lactate dehydrogenase deficiency
Adenosine monophosphate deaminase deficiency type 1
Thermal or electrical burn

Pathophysiology
Myoglobinuria pathophysiology consists of a series of metabolic actions in which damage to muscle cells affect calcium mechanisms, thereby increasing free ionized calcium in the cytoplasm of the myocytes (concurrently decreasing free ionized calcium in the bloodstream). This, in turn, affects several intracellular enzymes that are calcium-dependent, thereby compromising the cell membrane, which in turn causes the release of myoglobin.

Diagnosis
After centrifuging, the urine of myoglobinuria is red, where the urine of hemoglobinuria after centrifuge is pink to clear.

Treatment
Hospitalization and IV hydration should be the first step in any patient suspected of having myoglobinuria or rhabdomyolysis. The goal is to induce a brisk diuresis to prevent myoglobin precipitation and deposition, which can cause acute kidney injury. Mannitol can be added to assist with diuresis. Adding sodium bicarbonate to the IV fluids will cause alkalinization of the urine, believed to reduce the breakdown of myoglobin into its nephrotoxic metabolites, thus preventing renal damage. Often, IV normal saline is all that is needed to induce diuresis and alkalinize the urine.

Epidemiology

See also
Pigmenturia

References

Further reading

External links 

 Overview on the Neuromuscular disease center website.

Abnormal clinical and laboratory findings for urine